Dactylosporangium siamense is a bacterium from the genus Dactylosporangium which has been isolated from forest soil in Nakhon Sawan, Thailand.

References

 

Micromonosporaceae
Bacteria described in 2013